Senator Rees may refer to:

Edward Herbert Rees (1886–1969), Kansas State Senate
Thomas M. Rees (1925–2003), California State Senate

See also
Senator Reese (disambiguation)